Ammoudia may refer to the following places in Greece:

Ammoudia, Preveza, a village in the Preveza regional unit
Ammoudia, Serres, a village in the Serres regional unit